J. Jayalalithaa was sworn in as Chief Minister of Tamil Nadu on 23 May 2016. Two major political parties Dravida Munnetra Kazhagam (DMK) and All India Anna Dravida Munnetra Kazhagam (AIADMK) faced the assembly election held on 16 May 2016 for the 232 seats (except Thanjavur and Aravakurichi for which held on 26 October 2016) of the Legislative Assembly in the state of Tamil Nadu in India. AIADMK under J. Jayalalithaa won the elections and became the first ruling party to be re-elected in the state since 1984 with a simple majority. On 22 September 2016, Jayalalithaa was hospitalised as her health condition worsened. Her official duties were handed over to her aide O. Panneerselvam on 12 October 2016, though she continued to remain as the chief minister of the state. On 5 December 2016, the hospital announced her death and O. Panneerselvam sworn in as her successor.

Cabinet ministers

Achievements
The government within 100 days of resuming power on 23 May 2016, wrote off the outstanding crop loans given by cooperative banks to over 16.94 lakh farmers, gave free power to households to extent of first 100 units and gave free power to handloom weavers to extent of 200 units, gave 750 units of power to power loom weavers, implemented closure of 500 liquor shops and reduction of working hours of liquor outlets emergence of power surplus states. The establishment of first 1,000 MW nuclear power plant at Kudankulam is also regarded as one of the achievements. Jayalalithaa Government increased the freedom fighters monthly pension to Rs 12,000, family pension and increased special pension to Rs 6,000. On 21 September 2016 Jayalalithaa Government inaugurated two Chennai Metro rail lines by way of video conferencing.

References

All India Anna Dravida Munnetra Kazhagam
J
2010s in Tamil Nadu
2016 establishments in Tamil Nadu
Cabinets established in 2016
2016 in Indian politics